The fencing competitions at the 1995 Pan American Games took place in Mar Del Plata, Argentina.

Men's events

Women's events

Medal table

References

Events at the 1995 Pan American Games
Fencing at the Pan American Games
International fencing competitions hosted by Argentina
1995 in fencing